Pat Cleary (born 15 January 1962) is an Irish retired hurler who played as a right corner-forward for the Offaly senior team.

Cleary made his first appearance for the team during the 1981-82 National Hurling League and became a regular player over the course of the following decade. During that time he won one All-Ireland winner's medal, three Leinster winner's medals and an All-Star award.

At club level Cleary began his career with Ballyskenagh, before later playing with Kilmacud Crokes and Portlaoise. He won numerous county championship winners' medals with the latter two teams.

References

1962 births
Living people
Ballyskenagh hurlers
Kilmacud Crokes hurlers
Portlaoise hurlers
Offaly inter-county hurlers
All-Ireland Senior Hurling Championship winners